The 2006 Tennessee Lady Volunteers softball team was an American softball team, representing the University of Tennessee for the 2005 NCAA softball season. The team played their home games at Tyson Park. The team made it to the 2006 Women's College World Series, finishing third for the 2nd straight year.

Roster

Schedule 

|-
!colspan=9| Louisville Slugger Tournament

|-
!colspan=9| NFCA Leadoff Tournament

|-
!colspan=9| Worth Tournament

|-
!colspan=9| USF Adidas Tournament

|-
!colspan=9|

|-
!colspan=9|SEC Tournament

|-
!colspan=9|NCAA Knoxville Regional

|-
!colspan=9|NCAA Knoxville Super Regional

|-
!colspan=9|NCAA Women's College World Series

References 

Tennessee Volunteers softball seasons
Tennessee
Tennessee Volunteers softball season
Tennessee
Women's College World Series seasons